Stefan White was a Gaelic footballer for the Louth county team in the 1980s and 1990s. He played for O'Connells, Castleblayney Faughs, Clan na Gael, Burren and finished his career with a second spell with hometown club O'Connells.

He won an Ulster SFC with the Monaghan county team in 1988 and several Monaghan SFC with Castleblayney. Stefan is a son of former Louth great, and 1957 All Ireland winner Stephen White.

References

Year of birth missing (living people)
Living people
Louth inter-county Gaelic footballers
O'Connells Gaelic footballers
Monaghan inter-county Gaelic footballers
Castleblayney Faughs Gaelic footballers